Oak Hill is an unincorporated community in Pulaski County, in the U.S. state of Kentucky.

According to tradition, Oak Hill takes its name from a Baptist church of the same name on a hill with oak trees.

References

Unincorporated communities in Pulaski County, Kentucky